Patricia Helen Rogers (died September 2005 in Charlottetown, Prince Edward Island) was a Canadian philanthropist and social activist, who was named a member of the Queen's Privy Council for Canada in 1992. Her accomplishments included founding Pat and the Elephant, a transportation service for people with disabilities in Charlottetown.

References

External links
 Pat and the Elephant

Year of birth missing
2005 deaths
Canadian women philanthropists
Canadian philanthropists
People from Charlottetown